The Fairlawn Neighborhood in Kokomo, Indiana is an almost entirely residential neighborhood in the center of the city.

History
Little is known about Fairlawn, or its start, however it can be seen on city maps as far back as the early 1900s. It is now recognized as an official neighborhood though according to the city and their Kokomo City-Line Trolley transportation maps.

Geography
The neighborhood is bounded by Ohio to the east, Home Avenue / Apperson Way to the west, east Defenbaugh Street to the south and Markland Avenue to the North. Major roadways traversing through the Fairlawn Neighborhood include Markland Avenue (Indiana State Road 22) running east and west and Home Avenue and Apperson Way traveling north and south. Jay Street is also semi-important with it having a stop light on it on Markland Avenue.

Businesses 
Advance Auto Part
Marathon Gas
Lexi's Drink Barn

Transportation

Highways

  IN-22 to Burlington (West) and Hartford City (East)

Railroads
 Norfolk Southern Railway (The track from Kokomo to Tipton will return to service.)

Bus service
 Kokomo City-Line Trolley A fixed-route transportation system, five bus routes run past a total of exactly 275 stops, passing each stop once every hour, from 6:30 a.m. to 6 p.m., Monday through Friday. The buses also have wireless internet for riders, which like the buses, is free to riders.

Trails and paths
 Industrial Heritage Trail - Construction beginning in 2011, the Industrial Heritage Trail is currently  in length and follows the right-of-way of a railroad corridor. The northern terminus is near the intersection of Apperson Way and Washington Street. The southern terminus is just south of the intersection of Lincoln Road and Home Avenue.

References 

Kokomo, Indiana